MY Apodis, also known as L 19-2, GJ 2108, or WD 1425-811, is a single white dwarf star located in the far southern constellation Apus. It is a low-amplitude variable star with an average apparent visual magnitude of 13.75 and thus is much too faint to be visible to the naked eye. Based on parallax measurements, this star is located at a distance of 68.3 light-years from the Sun. It is drifting further away with a radial velocity of 58.0

This compact stellar remnant has a class of DA4.1, which indicates a hydrogen-rich outer atmosphere. It is a pulsating white dwarf (ZZ Ceti star) that varies photometrically with an amplitude of 0.05 in visual magnitude. The low-amplitude variability of this ZZ Ceti analog was discovered by James E. Hesser and associates in 1974, who found it showed periods of 192.75 and 113.77 seconds. By 2015, ten different pulsation modes had been identified, and it remained stable over four decades of observation.

MY Apodis has 70.5% of the mass of the Sun compressed down into 1.1% of the Sun's radius. It is spinning rapidly with a rotation period of 13 hours.

References

Pulsating white dwarfs
Apus (constellation)
Apodis, MY